Michael Liam McQuillan is a Scottish mathematician studying algebraic geometry.  As of 2019 he is Professor at the University of Rome Tor Vergata.

Career
Michael McQuillan received the doctorate in 1992 at  Harvard University under Barry Mazur ("Division points on semi-Abelian varieties").

In 1996, MacQuillan gave a new proof of a conjecture of André Bloch (1926) about holomorphic curves in closed subvarieties of Abelian varieties, proved a conjecture of  Shoshichi Kobayashi (about the  Kobayashi-hyperbolicity of generic hypersurfaces of high degree in projective n-dimensional space) in the three-dimensional case and achieved partial results on a conjecture of Mark Green and Phillip Griffiths (which states that a holomorphic curve on an algebraic surface of general type with   cannot be Zariski-dense).

From 1996 to 2001 he was a post-doctoral Research Fellow at All Souls College of the University of Oxford and in 2009 was Professor at the University of Glasgow as well as Advanced Research Fellow of the British  Engineering and Physical Sciences Research Council. As of 2019 he is Professor at the University of Rome Tor Vergata and an editor of the European Journal of Mathematics.

Awards
In 2000 McQuillan received the EMS Prize, which was announced from the European Congress of Mathematics in July 2000, for his work:

In 2001 he was awarded the  Whitehead Prize of the  London Mathematical Society. In 2002 he was invited speaker at the  International Congress of Mathematicians in Beijing (Integrating ). In 2001 he received the  Whittaker Prize.

References 

20th-century Scottish mathematicians
21st-century Scottish mathematicians
Whitehead Prize winners
Living people
Academic staff of the University of Rome Tor Vergata
Harvard University alumni
Year of birth missing (living people)
Algebraic geometers
Sir Edmund Whittaker Memorial Prize winners